The Ship may refer to:

Film and TV and games
The Ship (film), a 1921 Italian silent historical drama film
 The Ship (TV series), a 2002 documentary film
 The Ship (video game), a first person shooter computer game
 "The Ship" (Star Trek: Deep Space Nine), a 1996 episode of Star Trek: Deep Space Nine

Books
 The Ship (novel), a 1943 novel written by C.S. Forester
 The Ship, a book by Björn Landström
 The Ship, a 1922 play by St. John Greer Ervine
 The Ship (magazine), published annually by St Anne's College, Oxford

Buildings
 Hawthorne Smoke Shop, a gambling casino later known as The Ship
 "The Ship", Derriford, an office building in Plymouth, England, UK
 Old Ship Hotel, Brighton, England, UK, formerly called "The Ship"

Pubs
 The Ship, Hart Street, London
 The Ship, Lime Street, London
 The Ship, New Cavendish Street, London
 Ship Tavern, Holborn, London

Music
 The Ship (album), an album by Brian Eno, 2016
"The Ship", song by Ivor Gurney

See also 
 Ship (disambiguation)
 The Boat (disambiguation)